Moshk (also Romanized as Mashk; also known as Moshg) is a village in Rud Ab-e Sharqi Rural District, Rud Ab District, Narmashir County, Kerman Province, Iran. At the 2006 census, its population was 690, in 174 families.

References 

Populated places in Narmashir County